Mansion of the Living Dead is a 1982 erotic horror film written and directed by Jesús Franco, said to be based on his own novel (which never existed).  It stars Franco's most often used actress, Lina Romay, who is credited here as Candy Coster. Franco also edited the film, and dubbed the voice of actor Albino Graziani. The make-up on the zombie monks was extremely low budget, consisting mostly of dried shaving cream lather rubbed on the actor's faces.

Plot 
Several waitresses visit an almost abandoned resort hotel out of season, only to find that the long-dead monks of the local former monastery have returned as zombies. One by one, a strange force lures the women out of the hotel down into the crypt beneath the monastery, where they are sexually molested and brutally murdered by the zombie monks, all choreographed to eerie music, a tolling bell and the melancholy sound of the wind blowing around the monastery.

Cast 
 Candy Coster as Candy
 Mabel Escano as Mabel
 Antonio Mayans as Carlo Savonarola (as Robert Foster)
 Eva León as Olivia
 Albino Graziani as Marleno
 Mari Carmen Nieto as Lea (as Mamie Kaplan)
 Elisa Vela as Caty (as Jasmina Bell)

Release 
Severin Films released it on DVD on October 31, 2006.

Reception 
Ian Jane of DVD Talk rated it 3.5/5 stars and wrote, "More of an artsy softcore romp than a horror film, Mansion Of The Living Dead should still appeal to those who appreciate the low budget charm of Franco's erotic films and who dig the odd touches that can be found in so much of his work."  Rob Lineberger of DVD Verdict wrote that the film consists mostly of boring scenes where the actresses walk around the set.

Writing in The Zombie Movie Encyclopedia, academic Peter Dendle said, "The film is marked throughout, however, by a disturbing hostility toward women: they are sexual objects from the start to the finish, and the voyeuristic impulse would seem less offensive if it weren't accompanied by unashamed misogynistic violence."  Dendle called the zombies featured in the film "among the ideological and aesthetic low-points of the species".

References

External links 
 

1982 films
1982 horror films
1980s erotic films
Spanish zombie films
Spanish erotic films
1980s Spanish-language films
Sexploitation films
Pornographic zombie films
Films directed by Jesús Franco
1980s exploitation films
1980s horror thriller films
Erotic horror films